"You're the Only One" is a song by Norwegian pop musician Maria Mena. The song was included on her second studio album, Mellow (as well as the international version, White Turns Blue), and was released as the album's first single in early 2004. In addition to becoming a number-eight hit in her native Norway, it was Mena's breakthrough hit internationally, charting within the top 40 in Denmark, the Netherlands and New Zealand. It was also her first single released in the United States, where it rose to number 86 on the Billboard Hot 100.

Lyrical content
A DVD included with the deluxe edition of White Turns Blue contains an interview with Mena. She stated "You're the Only One" is about all of her friends, each verse representing a different person, but she liked that it could be interpreted to be about one boy. She said that it is her way of telling her friends that she appreciates what they do for her and that she loves them.

Critical reception
AllMusic critic Johnny Loftus gave "You're the Only One" a positive review, praising its "shimmery" composition Mena's "chatty" vocals. He also noted that, unlike American pop princesses such as Hilary Duff, Mena did not mitigate her blunt lyrics regarding teenage experimentation. Loftus summarized, "Her mix of emotionally rich pragmatism with lighthearted amiability is delightful, and only heightened by "Only One"'s inviting pop whir."

Chart performance
"You're the Only One" was released as the second single from Mellow in early 2004. It first appeared on Norway's VG-lista chart at number 11 on the ninth chart week of 2004, which corresponds to late February. Two weeks later, it peaked at number eight, then remained in the top 10 for two more weeks before dropping out.

In June, the single began to experience success outside Norway. Following plentiful radio airplay, it debuted at number 88 on the US Billboard Hot 100 on the issue dated 12 June, then reached its peak of number 86 the following week. It also appeared on the Billboard Mainstream Top 40 and Adult Top 40 charts, peaking at numbers 25 and 31, respectively. On 28 June, the track debuted at number 36 on the New Zealand Singles Chart and peaked at number 35 during its second week in, then left the top 50.

"You're the Only One" continued to chart throughout July, August, and September in several other countries. In Denmark, it debuted and peaked at number 15 on 23 July, then rose to number 19 on the Dutch Single Top 100 eight days later. In Australia, the single peaked at number 70, while in the Flanders region of Belgium, it reached number six on the Ultratip Bubbling Under listing.

Track listings

Norwegian CD1 and US CD single
 "You're the Only One" – 2:45
 "Patience" – 3:49

Norwegian CD2
 "You're the Only One" – 2:44
 "Patience" – 3:49
 "Sleep to Dream" – 3:38
 "You're the Only One" (video) – 2:44

Australian and New Zealand maxi-CD single
 "You're the Only One" – 2:44
 "Patience" – 3:49
 "Sleep to Dream" – 3:38

Credits and personnel
Credits are lifted from the US CD single liner notes.

Studios
 Mixed at Lydlab Studio (Oslo, Norway)
 Mastered at Cutting Room Studios (Stockholm, Sweden)

Personnel

 Maria Mena – writing, vocals
 Arvid Solvang – writing, acoustic guitars, electric guitars, piano, production, programming
 Vemund Stavnes – bass
 Fredrik Wallumrød – drums

 Celsius – keyboard, additional programming
 Ulf Holand – mixing
 Thomas Eberger – mastering
 Gunnar Eide Concerts – management

Charts

Release history

References

2004 singles
2004 songs
Columbia Records singles
English-language Norwegian songs
Norwegian pop songs
Songs about teenagers